Larry Millett (born 1947 in Minneapolis, Minnesota) is an American journalist and author.  He is the former (retired 2002) architectural critic for the St. Paul Pioneer Press, a daily newspaper in St. Paul, Minnesota, and the author of several books on the history of architecture in Minnesota.  He has also written a series of Sherlock Holmes mysteries set in the United States and Minnesota in the 1890s.  The books feature the character Shadwell Rafferty, who assists Holmes in his American investigations.

Education
Millett attended St. John's University in Collegeville, Minnesota, where he graduated with a Bachelor of Arts degree in English in 1969.  He went on to Chicago, Illinois, where he obtained an English Masters degree in 1970 from the University of Chicago.

Career
Millett worked at the Pioneer Press from 1972 until 1984 when he had an opportunity to study architecture at the University of Michigan.  When he returned to St. Paul in 1985, he became the newspaper's first architecture critic. He has written articles for several historical and architectural magazines in the Midwest, mostly focusing on works by Prairie School architects such as Louis Sullivan and Frank Lloyd Wright.

Millett's Lost Twin Cities is probably the best known of his works in the Minneapolis-St. Paul region largely because KTCA, a local public television station, created a video documentary by the same name which covered a few of the buildings in the book.  The video was narrated by Dave Moore, a noted area TV journalist, and is often replayed when the station is running a pledge drive. In 2014, Millet was interviewed by Peter Shea for the Institute for Advanced Study at the University of Minnesota.  He has also been interviewed twice on the Northern Lights Minnesota Author Interview TV Series.

External links
Interview with Peter Shea at University of Minnesota, 2014

Bibliography

Nonfiction
The Curve of the Arch: The Story of Louis Sullivan's Owatonna Bank (1985)  & 
Lost Twin Cities (1992) 
Twin Cities Then and Now (1996)  & 
National Register of Historic Places in Minnesota (foreword, 2003) 
Strange Days, Dangerous Nights: Photos from the Speed Graphic Era (2004) 
AIA Guide to the Twin Cities: The Essential Source on the Architecture of Minneapolis and St. Paul (Paperback) (2007) 
Murder Has a Public Face (2008)
AIA Guide to Downtown Minneapolis (2010) 
Once There Were Castles: Lost Mansions and Estates of the Twin Cities (2011)
Minnesota's Own (2014)

Fiction

Sherlock Holmes in Minnesota
Sherlock Holmes and the Red Demon (1996) 
Sherlock Holmes and the Ice Palace Murders (1998)  & 
Sherlock Holmes and the Rune Stone Mystery (1999)  & 
Sherlock Holmes and the Secret Alliance (2001)
The Disappearance of Sherlock Holmes (2002)  
"The Mystery of the Jeweled Cross" (short story, 2002)  & 
"The Brewer's Son" (short story, 2006)
The Magic Bullet: A Locked Room Mystery Featuring Shadwell Rafferty and Sherlock Holmes (2011) 
Strongwood: A Crime Dossier (2014) 
Sherlock Holmes and the Eisendorf Enigma (2017)

Other works
Pineland Serenade (2020)

External links
 Author's website
Larry Millett talks about Twin Cities Then and Now with David Wiggins; also discusses his first mystery book with Bruce Southworth, Northern Lights Minnesota Author Interview TV Series #378 (1997):  [https://reflections.mndigital.org/catalog/p16022coll38:74#/kaltura_video] 
Larry Millett talks about Lost Twin Cities with Steve Benson, Northern Lights Minnesota Author Interview TV Series #329 (1995):  [https://reflections.mndigital.org/catalog/p16022coll38:58#/kaltura_video] 

1947 births
Living people
College of Saint Benedict and Saint John's University alumni
American male journalists
Writers from Minneapolis
Novelists from Minnesota
Taubman College of Architecture and Urban Planning alumni